A pitchfork an agricultural tool with a long handle used to lift and throw loose material.

Pitchfork may also refer to:

 Pitchfork (album), by Clutch, 1991
 Pitchfork (band), an American post-hardcore band
 Pitchfork (film), a 2016 horror film
 Pitchfork (website), an American online music publication 
 Pitchfork Music Festival, an annual event
 Colin Pitchfork (born 1960), a British convicted murderer and rapist
 Maureen Pitchfork (born 1934), an English swimmer

See also
 
 
 Project Pitchfork, a German electronic musical group
 Pitchfork bifurcation, in mathematics